Godyr is a department or commune of Sanguié Province in central Burkina Faso. Its capital lies at the town of Godyr.

Towns and villages

References

Departments of Burkina Faso
Sanguié Province